Joseph Patrick Ryan (July 5, 1936 – November 7, 2016) was an American businessman and politician.

Born in Cleveland, Ohio, Ryan served in the United States Air Force following high school. He settled in Canton, Ohio during the early 1960s, then moved to Fairbanks, Alaska in 1975. Ryan worked as a mechanic during the construction of the Trans-Alaska Pipeline System and later as an airline transport pilot. He served on the Fairbanks North Star Borough Assembly for a single term, from 1987 to 1990, winning election by defeating an eleven-year incumbent. Ryan was a Republican and active in the Alaska Republican Party, serving as the organization's platform chair at one point. From 1997 to 1999, Ryan served in the Alaska House of Representatives representing east Anchorage. Ryan returned to Fairbanks in later life, where he died on November 7, 2016.

References

External links
 Joe Ryan at 100 Years of Alaska's Legislature

1936 births
2016 deaths
Aviators from Alaska
Businesspeople from Anchorage, Alaska
Businesspeople from Fairbanks, Alaska
Fairbanks North Star Borough Assembly members
Republican Party members of the Alaska House of Representatives
Politicians from Anchorage, Alaska
Politicians from Canton, Ohio
Politicians from Cleveland
Politicians from Fairbanks, Alaska
20th-century American businesspeople